Elna Hansson (1814–1891), was a Swedish cunning woman and feldsher. She was the first woman feldsher in Sweden.

Life

She was the daughter of the cunning woman Marna Nilsdotter of Lund and was the fifth generation of cunning women in a family famous for practicing traditional medicine.  Her father and husband are only referred to as "laborers". She became the mother of the cunning woman Johanna Maria Andersson, and the grandmother of 
Hedda Andersson. 

She settled in Malmö after her marriage in 1833, and established herself as a medical practitioner. As her mother before her, she specialized in the healing of wounds and fractures. In contrast to most cunning practitioners of her time, she did not use any magic spells during her work, which contributed to her good name as she came to be regarded more as a scientific physician. She was widely credited for her success in managing to heal severe injuries which would otherwise have caused amputations, and which educated physicians before her had failed to cure, and thus having saved many from becoming invalids. She received clients from all over South Sweden, Norway and Denmark. Her good name was sufficient enough for town- and military physicians to recommend her to patients they had failed to cure. 

Regardless of her ability and success, she was still practicing without a license. In 1855, she was reported for quackery by the physician August Falck. She was summoned to court in 1856, and appealed to the king for dispensation to practice with reference to her long standing experience, success and content patients. The king received numerous letters from the public in support of Elna Hansson. Women were not allowed to study medicine, but in order to solve the issue, the king issued a royal letter granting permit for women to study surgery as feldshers in 1857. Elna Hansson took the feldsher exam in Stockholm and passed. She was thus likely the first woman feldsher in Sweden. 

Her feldsher license allowed her to practice medicine openly, and she opened her own official clinic, with room for seven patients. She practiced until her death. Her daughter joined her practice as a widow in 1866, also with permit to practice ad a feldsher. In 1870, women were officially allowed to study medicine in Sweden.  Elna Hansson and her daughter consequently decided that their granddaughter and daughter Hedda Andersson, the 7th-generation of a family of cunning women, should study medicine openly at the university and be given a medical license, to avoid the history of quackery charges which had affected the line of women medical practitioners in their family: Hedda Andersson became the second formally-trained women physician in Sweden.

References

Further reading 
  

1814 births
1891 deaths
Cunning folk
19th-century Swedish people
19th-century Swedish women
19th-century surgeons